Fortza Paris ("Forward Together") is a regionalist political party in Sardinia.

The party was launched in 2004 at the merger of the Sardinian People's Party (PPS), Sardistas and Unity of Sardinian People. Its self-proclaimed ideology comprises "all what the 20th Century had it good", including Christian democracy, liberalism, social democracy and federalism, but it is basically a Christian-democratic party. In fact, its main component, the PPS, had emerged from the regional section of the United Christian Democrats.

History
In the 2004 regional election FP won 4.6% of the vote and three regional councillors. In the 2005 provincial elections a member of FP, Pasquale Onida, was elected President of the province of Oristano, where the party's share reached 11.4%.

In the 2008 general election party leader Silvestro Ladu was an unsuccessful candidate for The People of Freedom (PdL) for the Senate. Later that year, several FP members, including Onida, Ladu and other two regional councillors (one coming from the Union of Christian and Centre Democrats) joined the PdL, while a minority, led by Gianfranco Scalas, did not.

In the 2009 Sardinian regional election FP won 2.2% in a joint list with the regional section of the Movement for Autonomies (a Sicilian-based party), but neither Scalas nor any other party members were elected to the Regional Council. However, two FP dissidents, Domenico Gallus and Renato Lai, who stood for the PdL, did get in. Later that year a former leader of FP, Adriano Aversano, launched Lega Sarda, that aimed at becoming the Sardinian "national section" of Lega Nord. In fact, in that very year the federal leadership of Lega Nord supported the creation of Lega Nord Sardinia.

In the 2010 provincial elections the party was able to field candidates in only half of Sardinian provinces and suffered a general decline in term of votes, except in its stronghold province of Oristano, where it won 9.9% of the vote. In the 2014 regional election the party won a mere 0.7% of the vote and was evicted from the Regional Council.

In the 2019 regional election the party won 1.6% within the centre-right coalition and obtained one seat in the Regional Council.

References

External links
Official website

2004 establishments in Italy
Christian democratic parties in Italy
Political parties established in 2004
Political parties in Sardinia
Catholic political parties